Head East (also known as The Roadsign Album) is the fourth studio album by the American hard rock band Head East. Released by A&M Records in February 1978, it was the group's fourth album to crack the Billboard 200, peaking at #78. The album also produced the band's highest-charting single, a cover of the Russ Ballard song "Since You Been Gone", which reached #46 on the Billboard Hot 100. The album has since been reissued on CD and as an MP3 download.

Personnel
 Roger Boyd - keyboards/vocals
 Steve Huston - drums/vocals
 Mike Somerville - guitar/vocals
 Dan Birney - bass
 John Schlitt - lead vocals

Track listing
A1 "Open Up the Door”(Huston) 
A2 "Man I Wanna Be"(Somerville) 
A3 "Nothing to Lose"(Birney) 
A4 "Since You Been Gone (Ballard)"
A5 "Pictures"(Huston)

B1 "Get Up & Enjoy Yourself"(Schlitt) 
B2 "I'm Feelin' Fine"(Boyd) 
B3 "Dance Away Lover"(Schlitt) 
B4 "Elijah"(Sabatino)

References

1980 albums
Head East albums